Pink Ocean is the third extended play (EP) by South Korean girl group Oh My Girl. It was released by WM Entertainment on March 28, 2016 and distributed by LOEN Entertainment. The album contains five songs, including the singles "Step by Step" and "Liar Liar". Oh My Girl promoted the album with a series of televised live performances on South Korea's music shows.

A reissue titled Windy Day, featuring the single of the same name, was released on May 26, 2016.

Background and release
Promotion for Oh My Girl's second EP, Closer, ended in November 2015, and the group began preparing for their next album soon afterwards. On December 9, they flew to Los Angeles for the album cover photoshoot and a promotional event. However, they were denied entry by customs officials because they did not disclose the true purpose of their trip and tried to enter the US as tourists under the visa waiver program, rather than obtaining the required performance visas.

On March 17, 2016, WM Entertainment announced that Oh My Girl would be releasing their third EP (also called a mini album). "Step by Step" was pre-released on March 21, and the album's title, Pink Ocean, and track list were revealed the next day. The album was released the following week on March 28, in both CD and digital format. A music video for lead single "Liar Liar" was released that same day.

On May 18, WM Entertainment announced that the album would be re-released on May 26 with three new tracks: "Windy Day", "Stupid in Love", and a Chinese version of "Liar Liar".

Production and composition
The music for "B612" was co-written by North American songwriters Sean Alexander and Darren Smith, who co-wrote Girls' Generation's "Lion Heart", as well as many of Oh My Girl's previous songs. Swedish songwriter and guitarist Andreas Öberg co-wrote "B612" and "Knock Knock" and English songwriter David Anthony co-wrote "Liar Liar" and "I Found Love". Seo Ji-eum of Jam Factory wrote the Korean lyrics for the first three songs on the album, and Oh My Girl member Mimi wrote the rap lyrics, with the rap in "Liar Liar" being inspired by Pinocchio. "Step by Step" was written by Jung Jin-young, a member of WM Entertainment's boy band B1A4.

"Liar Liar" is a dance-pop song with a hip hop drum beat. In the lyrics, the narrator is a girl who has a secret crush on a guy, but feels like she is "somewhere in between a dream and reality" because she is uncertain that her affection is returned. "B612" is a mid-tempo acoustic ballad inspired by The Little Prince—the prince's home planet is Asteroid B-612, and the song's lyrics compare the narrator and her crush to the rose and the prince. "I Found Love" is an R&B song with a strong drum rhythm, and is about a girl attending school and falling in love. "Knock Knock" is a retro-pop song about friendship. "Step by Step" was described as having a "dreamy" atmosphere and has rock-style rhythm with string instrumentation.

The vividly-colored music video for "Liar Liar" was produced by Digipedi and highlights the contrast between dreams and reality. In the story line, the girls are all in love with the same guy, but are hiding it from each other. It includes scenes shot underwater, a first for the group. In the dance version music video, they wear shoes that resemble roller skates.

The lead single of the album reissue, "Windy Day", is a folk-pop song composed by Öberg and Swedish producer Maria Marcus. It features vocal harmonies, acoustic guitar, and Middle Eastern-inspired horns. The lyrics, written by Seo and Mimi, express the complicated emotions of a girl's heart. The accompanying music video was filmed in Jeju Island in various outdoor settings, including a hedge maze and a forest. Like the music video for "Closer", it has a fairy tale and fantasy-inspired theme.

Promotion
On March 28, Oh My Girl held a comeback showcase at the Lotte Card Center in the Mecenatpolis Mall, Hapjeong-dong, Seoul. They performed songs from the album for the first time at the showcase. The group then promoted the album with performances of "Liar Liar" on various music shows, starting with M! Countdown on March 31. After the pre-recording for Show! Music Core on April 16, member Seunghee fainted and was hospitalized. Doctors determined she had hyperventilated due to stress, and she took a few days off to rest, before resuming activities with the group on April 21. On May 5, they began performing "Step by Step" on music shows. They concluded promotions for the album on May 8 with a final performance on Inkigayo. On May 26, promotion for the album reissue began with a performance of "Windy Day" on M! Countdown.

Reception

Pink Ocean

Pink Ocean entered the weekly Gaon Album Chart at number 5, selling 6,482 physical copies in three days. "Liar Liar" was number 58 on the Gaon Digital Chart for the week of March 27, and "Step by Step" was number 79 the previous week. "Liar Liar" also charted at number 9 on the Billboard World Digital Songs chart.

Jeff Benjamin of Fuse, who previously identified Oh My Girl as one of the best rookie acts of 2015, said "Liar Liar" was a unique blend of an "adorable aesthetic" and a "sassy attitude". He noted the song's "punchy" pop production and "addictive" hook, and identified "Knock Knock" and "Step by Step" as the album's standouts. He also praised Oh My Girl's stage performance and intricate choreography. Dazed magazine's Taylor Glasby ranked "Liar Liar" number 7 in Dazed's "The 20 best K-Pop tracks of the year", describing "Liar Liar" as an upbeat falsetto powerhouse that was skillfully connected with the music video.

Windy Day

Windy Day entered the Gaon Album Chart at number 4, selling 10,574 units in six days, while the song of the same name charted at number 62 on the digital chart.

In June, Benjamin included "Windy Day" in Fuse's list of "The 13 Best Girl Group Songs of 2016 (So Far)", calling it one of most unexpected girl group releases in 2016. Billboard magazine's Tamar Herman called "Windy Day" experimental and quirky, and said it showcased the members youthful vocals.

Track listing

Pink Ocean

Windy Day

Personnel 
Credits adapted from EP liner notes.

Pink Ocean
Locations

Recorded at Doobdoob Studio ("Liar Liar", "Step by Step")
Recorded at W Sound ("B612", I Found Love", "Knock Knock")
Edited at Doobdoob Studio ("B612", "I Found Love")
Mixed at W Sound ("B612", "I Found Love", "Knock Knock")
Mixed at Bono Studio ("I Found Love")
Mastered at JFS Mastering

Personnel

Oh My Girl – vocals, background vocals (on "Liar Liar", "Step by Step")
WM Entertainment Inc. – executive producer
Lee Won-min – producer
Kim Jin-mi – executive director
Moon Jung-kyu – music producer
72 – music producer
Maxx Song – vocal director, recording engineer
Jo Joon-seong – mixing engineer
Go Seung-wook – mixing engineer
Kwon Nam-woo – mastering engineer
Soulme – choreography director
Digipedi – music video director
Jo Dae-young – art direction and design
AHMI – art direction and design
Choi Dae-young – photographer
David Anthony – guitar, bass guitar, drum programming (on "Liar Liar", "I Found Love")
Maxx Song – vocal director (on "Liar Liar", "Step by Step"), guitar, recording engineer (on "Step by Step")
Lee Ji-hong – digital editor (on "Liar Liar", "I Found Love", "Step by Step")
Heo Eun-sook – digital editor (on "B612", "Knock Knock"), mix assistant (on "Liar Liar", B612", "Knock Knock", "Step by Step")
Choi Ja-yeon – mix assistant (on "Liar Liar", "B612", "Step by Step"), recording engineer (on "I Found Love", "Knock Knock")
Jo Joon-seong – mix engineer (on "Liar Liar", "B612", "Step by Step")
Kwon Nam-woo – mastering engineer (on "Liar Liar", "B612", "I Found Love", "Knock Knock", "Step by Step")
Darren Smith – keyboard, bass guitar, drum programming (on "B612")
Andreas Öberg – keyboard (on "B612"), guitar (on "B612", "Knock Knock"), bass guitar (on "B612", "Knock Knock")
Park Eun-woo – background vocals (on "B612", "I Found Love", "Knock Knock")
72 – vocal director (on "B612", "I Found Love", "Knock Knock")
Moon Jung-kyu – vocal director (on "B612", "I Found Love", "Knock Knock")
Seon Yeong – mix assistant (on "I Found Love")
Go Seung-wook – mix engineer (on "I Found Love", "Knock Knock")
Pär Almqvist – keyboard, drum programming (on "Knock Knock")
August Vinberg – keyboard, drum programming (on "Knock Knock")
Ahn Sung-chan – keyboard (on "Step by Step")
Pae Su-jung – background vocals (on "Step by Step")

Windy Day
Locations

Recorded at Doobdoob Studio ("Windy Day", "Stupid in Love", "Liar Liar", "Step by Step", "Liar Liar (Chinese version)")
Recorded at W Sound ("Windy Day", "B612", I Found Love", "Knock Knock")
Edited at Doobdoob Studio ("Windy Day", "B612", "I Found Love")
Mixed at W Sound ("Windy Day", "B612", "I Found Love", "Knock Knock", "Liar Liar (Chinese version)")
Mixed at Bono Studio ("Stupid in Love", "I Found Love")
Mastered at JFS Mastering

Personnel

Oh My Girl – vocals, background vocals (on "Liar Liar", "Step by Step")
WM Entertainment Inc. – executive producer
Lee Won-min – producer
Kim Jin-mi – executive director
Moon Jung-kyu – music producer
72 – music producer
Maxx Song – recording engineer
Chang Woo-young – recording engineer
Lee Ji-hong – recording engineer
Heo Eun-sook – recording engineer
Choi Ja-yeon – recording engineer
Jo Joon-seong – mixing engineer
Kwon Nam-woo – mastering engineer
Soulme – choreography director
Digipedi – music video director
Jo Dae-young – art direction and design
AHMI – art direction and design
JDZ Chung – photographer
Maria Marcus – keyboard (on "Windy Day", "B612"), guitar (on "B612", "Knock Knock"), bass guitar (on "B612", "Knock Knock"), drum programming (on "Windy Day")
Andreas Öberg – guitar, bass guitar (on "Windy Day")
Hyun Seunghee (Oh My Girl) – background vocals (on "Windy Day", "Stupid in Love", "Liar Liar (Chinese version)")
Sinnara – background vocals (on "Windy Day")
Park Eun-woo – background vocals (on "B612", "I Found Love", "Knock Knock")
Pea Su-jung – background vocals (on "Step by Step")
Maxx Song – vocal director (on "Windy Day", "Liar Liar", "Step by Step", recording engineer (on "Windy Day", "Step by Step"), digital editor (on "Windy Day"), guitar (on "Step by Step")
Lee Ji-hong – digital editor (on "Windy Day", "Stupid in Love", "Liar Liar", "I Found Love", "Step by Step", "Liar Liar (Chinese version)"), recording engineer (on "Stupid In Love", "Liar Liar (Chinese version)")
Heo Eun-sook – digital editor (on "B612", "Knock Knock"), mix assistant (on "Windy Day", "Liar Liar", "B612", "Knock Knock", "Step by Step", "Liar Liar (Chinese version)")
Choi Ja-yeon – mix assistant (on "Windy Day", "Liar Liar", "B612", "Step by Step", "Liar Liar (Chinese version)"), recording engineer (on "I Found Love", "Knock Knock")
Jo Joon-seong – mixing engineer (on "Windy Day", "Liar Liar", "B612", "Step by Step", "Liar Liar (Chinese version)")
Kwon Nam-woo – mastering engineer (on "Windy Day", "Stupid in Love", "Liar Liar", "B612", "I Found Love", "Knock Knock", "Step by Step", "Liar Liar (Chinese version)")
Darren Smith – keyboard, bass guitar, drum programming (on "Stupid in Love", "B612")
Pär Almqvist – keyboard, drum programming (on "Knock Knock")
August Vinberg – keyboard, drum programming (on "Knock Knock")
Ahn Sung-chan - keyboard (on "Step by Step")
Evan Haymond – guitar (on "Stupid In Love")
72 – vocal director (on "Stupid In Love", "B612", "I Found Love", "Knock Knock")
Moon Jung-kyu – vocal director (on "Stupid In Love", "B612", "I Found Love", "Knock Knock")
Chang Woo-young – recording engineer (on "Stupid In Love", "Liar Liar (Chinese version)"), digital editor (on "Liar Liar (Chinese version)")
Seon Yeong – mix assistant (on "Stupid In Love", "I Found Love")
Go Seung-wook – mixing engineer (on "Stupid In Love", "I Found Love", "Knock Knock")
David Anthony – guitar, bass guitar, drum programming (on "Liar Liar", "I Found Love", "Liar Liar (Chinese version)"), keyboard (on "Liar Liar (Chinese version)")
T.M – background vocals, vocal director (on "Liar Liar (Chinese version)")

Charts

Pink Ocean

Windy Day

Release history

Notes

References

External links
 Pink Ocean album highlight on YouTube
 "Liar Liar" on YouTube
 "Windy Day" on YouTube

Oh My Girl albums
2016 EPs
Korean-language EPs
Kakao M EPs